Amser Te was a Welsh regional TV magazine programme produced by TWW for ten years, from 1958–1968.  Amser Te means 'Tea Time' in English.

Content 
The format was a general interest magazine programme, which featured a regular cookery item as a tail-end, hosted by Myfanwy Howell.

References 

1958 British television series debuts
1950s Welsh television series
1960s Welsh television series
1968 British television series endings
ITV regional news shows
Mass media in Wales